The 1989 Cleveland mayoral election took place on November 7, 1989, to elect the Mayor of Cleveland, Ohio. The election was officially nonpartisan, with the top two candidates from the October 3 primary advancing to the general election.

Both candidates who advanced to the runoff were African American and Democrats.

Candidates
Benny Bonanno, County Recorder
George L. Forbes, City Council President
Tim Hagan, County Commissioner
Ralph J. Perk, Jr.
Michael R. White, State Senator

Primary election

General election

References

1980s in Cleveland
Cleveland mayoral
Cleveland
Mayoral elections in Cleveland
Non-partisan elections
November 1989 events in the United States